Round Top Park was a Gettysburg Battlefield excursion park of  east of Little Round Top near the end of the Round Top Branch and owned by the Gettysburg & Harrisburg Railroad (cf. Pine Grove Park).  In addition to amusements, the park provided services during the memorial association era for steamtrain and trolley tourists visiting nearby military sites of the Battle of Gettysburg.

History
The "dummy" Baldwin steam engine had begun pulling excursions to the "hill" in June 1884 (Ephram H. Minnigh was the park manager) and on July 4, Colonel John H. McClellan held a free ox roast at the park's "great Railroad pic-nic" for donations to benefit the Carlisle Indian Industrial School.  The park had a large covered pavilion on June 17, 1884; a "large dining pavilion" completed on July 29, 1884; a "dance house" (dancing pavilion) by August 12, 1884; and a cook house.  Amusements at Round Top Park included target shooting, and its "Merry-Go-Round" was offered for sale in 1894.  In 1886, the Gettysburg Battlefield Memorial Association purchased "the grove in and around Round Top" and after the 1889 Pennsylvania Reserves reunion in the pavilion, the GBMA removed the buildings in 1896.  On July 4, 1900, the former Round Top Park was used by the Tacony Rifles'.  The nearby Cunningham Grove was acquired by a United States Department of War lawsuit, Round Top Park was voluntarily transferred to the War Dept from the GBMA, and in the late 20th century the nearby Hudson Grove and Rosensteel Park were acquired by the National Park Service.

References

Amusement parks in Pennsylvania
Defunct amusement parks in Pennsylvania